Dwight Marcus (born Dwight Marcus Glodell) was the Chief Technology Officer and one of the co-founders of NPOWR Digital Media.
He attended Worcester Polytechnic Institute, where he was a Henry J. Fuller Scholar. Marcus is also the inventor of the stimTV Network (not the current holder of the stimtv.com URL), which in 2007 won the Technology and Engineering Emmy Award from the National Academy of Television Arts and Sciences.

Career

Technology
Dwight was Chief Technology Officer at Medic Interactive Corporation (1994), a Manhattan-based media technology company. Dwight transitioned to NTECH, Inc. and its licensee NPOWR Digital Media, where his System for the Automated Generation of Media, filed in 1997, was awarded US patent (#6032156) in 2000.

Dwight and Robert Whitmore applied the patent's on-demand technology as the basis for their venture, stimTV™, a video-on-demand music entertainment provider founded in 2005. In 2007, stimTV was awarded a Technology and Engineering Emmy Award as part of the 58th Technology and Engineering Emmy Awards, for "Outstanding Innovation and Achievement in Advanced Media Technology for the best use of 'On Demand' Technology."

Dwight co-founded Motivideo with Robert Whitmore, which company is applying self-assembling unicast video technology to lifestyle coaching. , Dwight is also Managing Partner of the technology company Vushaper, which has developed the Video Assembly Engine used for user-driven unicast video streams in conjunction with developer 8th Light. He continues to develop technologies and applications for the creation and delivery of personalized media for general consumers and the healthcare industry.

Dwight has numerous patents granted in the US, Canada and Australia, with pending patents in the EPO regions. The portfolio is administered in partnership with the IP division of the law firm of Troutman Sanders of New York City, an AmLaw 100 firm.

Arts
Throughout his career in entertainment and media technology, Marcus Dwight has maintained a parallel career as a musician and music producer. His early work was credited as Dwight Glodell and includes a Billboard "Top Album Pick", punk by New Math, 145 and The Presstones, dance/trance by Personal Effects. He later worked under the name Dwight Marcus, with a diverse group of artists including "The Outlaws", as bandleader, producer and mixer of "The Obvious", Juno Award winner Shirley Eikhard (1987) and most notably Wendy MaHarry

In 1987, Dwight wrote and directed a 16 mm poetry film If You Smoke, Thank You, which won the 19th Annual Poetry Film Festival held in Fort Mason, San Francisco. In 1999 Marcus released "News From the West," by Dwight Marcus and the Chamber of Poets, a long-form music video that blended music, poetry, experimental film with 5.1 surround sound. News from the West is currently housed in the UC Berkeley Moffitt Library.

References

External links

 http://www.troutmansanders.com/intellectual_property/
 motivideo.com
 vushaper.com
 http://patft.uspto.gov/netacgi/nph-Parser?Sect1=PTO1&Sect2=HITOFF&d=PALL&p=1&u=%2Fnetahtml%2FPTO%2Fsrchnum.htm&r=1&f=G&l=50&s1=6032156.PN.&OS=PN/6032156&RS=PN/6032156
 http://www.businesswire.com/news/home/20070110006078/en/stimTV-Network-Wins-Emmy-Award-National-Television
 Dwight Marcus patent holder at US Patent Office
 Dwight Marcus, Wendy MaHarry music producer on AllMusic
 Dwight Marcus, Shirley Eikhard music producer
 Chamber of Poets, News from the West on Amazon.com
 Dwight Marcus & Chamber of Poets in the New York Times
 Dwight Marcus, Speaker at the Digital Hollywood trade conference
 Motivideo Systems, Inc.

Living people
Year of birth missing (living people)
American chief technology officers
Worcester Polytechnic Institute alumni
Place of birth missing (living people)